"Holy Water" is a song recorded by Swedish duo Galantis, incorporating uncredited vocals provided by British singer, songwriter and record producer Cathy Dennis. It was released on 27 September 2019, through Atlantic and Big Beat Records.

Critical reception 
Rachel Narozniak from Dancing Astronaut remarked the presence of "original lyrical concept", however with Galantis usual construction, similar to their past tracks such as "No Money" and "Runaway (U & I)". She also noted that the song is endowed with "driven chords that ascend in upbeat fashion in line with the cut's vocal, inescapably catchy vocal hooks, and buoyant breakdowns with deliberate dance floor appeal". Sarah Kocur from EDM.com called the song an "anthemic, effortlessly distorted single" which "gives listeners the last bit of summer energy as the season ends". Writing for Partyscene, Ivo Mollemans noted that it has "typical dance and pop elements" that the listeners are used to hear with Galantis. He indicated that the presence of "chords and vocals form the intro of the song and that immediately sets the tone for the rest of it" and really releases energy. According to him, the drop is "characterized by vocal chops that are still supported by chords and dance synths".

Music video 
The official music video of the song was released at the same day through Galantis YouTube channel. Directed by Jason Lester, who worked on Jesse McCartney song "Wasted", Fall Out Boy song "Wilson (Expensive Mistakes)" and Quinn XCII song "Werewolf", it features a choreography from synchronized swimming team Aqualillies and contains chopped quick edits in order to match the distorted vocals on the chorus of the track. The team perform in front of the eyes of jurors and spectators, including Galantis. In the course of the performance, the water is bathed in changing color worlds, and swimmers emanate from time to time at the edge of the pool to sing the lyrics of the song directly into the camera. DJ Mag France, Switzerland & Belgium deemed the clip of honoring synchronized swimming. Ivo Mollemans from Partyscene wrote that it "fits perfectly with the track, also because of the title".

Charts

References 

2019 songs
2019 singles
Galantis songs
Songs written by Cathy Dennis
Songs written by Henrik Jonback
Songs written by Christian Karlsson (DJ)
Atlantic Records singles
Big Beat Records (American record label) singles
Songs written by Style of Eye
Songs written by Svidden